Magic Carpet Ride (A.K.A.: Organized Jobs) is a 2005 Turkish comedy film, written and directed by Yılmaz Erdoğan, about a small-time criminal who accidentally recruits a failed comedy Superman impersonator into his gang.

Production
The film was shot on location in Istanbul, Turkey.

Plot
Asim Noyan (Yılmaz Erdoğan) and his gang make up a rambling collective, which concerns itself with a range of criminal activities, running from car theft to fraud. An inveterate womaniser, Asim meets the failed comedian Superman impersonator Samet (Tolga Cevik) while fleeing from an angry husband. Desperate Samet finds himself unwittingly implicated in the life of the gang. Meanwhile, Umut (Özgü Namal), the daughter of Mr and Mrs Ocak, a highly literate but hard-up couple, leads an altogether different life. The paths of Samet, Umut and Asim's gang cross because of a stolen car.

See also
 2005 in film

References

External links
  
 
 

2005 films
2000s Turkish-language films
2005 action comedy films
Films set in Turkey
Turkish action comedy films
Films scored by Ozan Çolakoğlu
2005 comedy films